Nautilus II was a motor pleasure boat built at City Island, New York in early 1917. She was enrolled in the Naval Coast Defense Reserve and commissioned into the United States Navy in October 1917 as the motor patrol boat USS Nautilus (SP-559), and assigned to patrol and escort duties of the New York City area for the remainder of World War I. She was decommissioned and returned to her owner, E.E. Dickinson of Essex County, Connecticut, on 14 February 1919.

The U.S. Navy considers the name Nautilus II to be separate from the Nautilus lineage.

References

External links
 
 Photo gallery at Naval Historical center

Motorboats of the United States Navy
1917 ships
Ships built in City Island, Bronx